Faust is a settlement located in central Tooele County, Utah, United States.

Description
The community was founded by Henry J. Faust (born Heinrich Jacob Faust), a Mormon immigrant from Germany. In 1860 he managed Faust Station on the Pony Express trail.  He later bought the property for his ranch. In 1870 Henry Faust and his wife moved to Salt Lake City. Faust has been used by the Union Pacific Railroad to house workers on the site. The area is popular with campers, mountain bikers, off-road vehicle enthusiasts, and hikers during the summer months.  Henry J. Faust was an ancestor of James E. Faust.

See also

References

External links

 Faust Pony Express Station, Tooele County (copy at archive.org)
 BLM Information Board "Outback",  Tooele County (copy at archive.org)

Unincorporated communities in Tooele County, Utah
Populated places established in 1870
Pony Express stations
Unincorporated communities in Utah
1870 establishments in Utah Territory